WLUX is a Catholic Religious formatted broadcast radio station licensed to Dunbar, West Virginia, serving Charleston and Nitro in West Virginia.  WLUX is owned and operated by St. Paul Radio Company.

References

External links

2011 establishments in West Virginia
Catholic radio stations
Radio stations established in 2011
LUX
Catholic Church in West Virginia